Stubbington House School was founded in 1841 as a boys' preparatory school, originally located in the Hampshire village of Stubbington, around  from the Solent. Stubbington House School was known by the sobriquet "the cradle of the Navy". The school was relocated to Ascot in 1962, merging with Earleywood School, and it closed in 1997.

History
Donald Leinster-Mackay, an academic researcher into the history of education, has said that "No school had stronger ties with the Royal Navy in the nineteenth century than Stubbington House." The school was founded in 1841 by the Reverend William Foster, who had been born around 1802 and was an alumnus of Trinity College, Cambridge. He had married Laura, a daughter of Rear-Admiral John Hayes, and it is probable that this accounts for the connection with the navy that the school developed. Another factor affecting its primary purpose was the introduction in 1838 of an entrance examination for the Royal Navy: although initially an undemanding test for most, this decision encouraged the development of specialised educational establishments, of which Stubbington House was a very early example. In addition, Hampshire has a historically close connection to the navy, and the closure of the Royal Naval College at Portsmouth in 1837, together with the deployment of HMS Britannia as a cadet training ship proved to be timely.

The original building was "a square Queen Anne house with a mid Georgian façade of 5 bays and 3 storeys in grey brick with red dressing and an open pedimented porch". The building had been constructed around 1715, supposedly with proceeds from contracts to supply the army and navy. In due course, it was extended to meet the demands of the school as the number of pupils increased. The site eventually included two separate sanatoria facilities, as well as a gymnasium and various other structures.

Beginning with 10 pupils, the school had around 40 a few years later, and 21 in 1871. William Foster died while away from home at Leamington in 1866. He was succeeded by one of his sons, Montagu Henry Foster, and by 1883 the school roll had increased to around 130 pupils. This increase is in part attributable to the efforts of Montagu's brother, the Reverend Courtenay Foster, who opened a department to train boys for entry to the army via Woolwich and Sandhurst, for which aim the boys stayed at the school for a longer time. Charlotte Mitchell, a senior lecturer in English Literature, has analysed surviving bank statements of Charlotte Mary Yonge, the writer. Mitchell has speculated that payments made by Yonge to a Mr Foster may relate to school fees for one of her nephews, Maurice Yonge, who was at Stubbington House when the 1881 census was taken. There were payments in 1880 of £59 12s. 8d. and £59 11s. 9d., followed in 1881 by payments of £61 13s. 5d. and £60 2s. 1d. Finally, in 1882, there was a payment of £66 0s. 2d.

Montagu Foster was involved in legal action on at least two occasions during his headmastership. In 1883 he lost an action brought by a former master that related to constructive dismissal, during the proceedings of which several witnesses commented on the lack of discipline at the school. Subsequently, in 1897, The British Medical Journal reported that he had successfully sued a parent in relation to monies owing for out-of-term care of a pupil who had fallen ill. He also found his school among a handful that were subjected to criticism by the Association of Preparatory School Headmasters, who, in 1901, were successful in persuading the Admiralty that the official recognition of this small number as naval entrance examination centres gave an unfair advantage.

The school uniform around this period was "... an Eton type jacket with long sleeves and a waistcoat. [The] trousers were black and grey striped — long or short according to age. Caps bearing the MHF (Montagu Henry Foster) school badge were worn. In winter bowlers were worn for church with boaters in the summer."

Montagu died in April 1913, leaving an estate that was valued at £163,140. According to Alumni Cantabrigienses, his son, Montagu Richard William Foster (1870-1935), had taken over as headmaster in 1903 and continued in that role until 1928, the same year that he received a knighthood. However, Leinster-Mackay says that the change of office took place at the time of Montagu's death in 1913.

Montagu junior had been born and educated at the school, and subsequently he had taken his degree at Trinity College, Cambridge. He had taken over running the army department upon the early death of his uncle, Courtenay, but closed it in 1913 and thus reduced the school roll by around 50 pupils. Changes in government policy, which came about primarily because of the escalating naval rivalry between Britain and Germany, also affected the school population. A reduction in numbers came with the closure of the Britannia cadet training facility, causing pupils to leave at an earlier age for the Royal Naval College at Osborne House on the Isle of Wight. The outcome of these changes was that there were 77 pupils in 1913.

The Foster family line of ownership and headmastership continued with Hugh Richard Montagu Foster, who took over from his father in 1928. In 1930, the school was advertising that it had 130 pupils, and Hugh continued in charge until near to his own death in July 1959. Hugh's obituarist in The Times noted that this was the end of the male line, although there were plans to continue the school, and that 

The arrangement of the business was adjusted in 1958 with the creation of a charitable trust but the Foster family remained as owners until 1963, paying a headmaster to run the school. A combination of death duties demanded from the family and also the high cost of maintaining the buildings caused the school to move to Ascot in 1962. There it merged with the long-established Earleywood School before subsequently closing on 7 July 1997. A limited company, Stubbington House Earleywood Limited, had been formed in 1963.

A few of the school buildings still remain in Stubbington, although most became derelict within a year of them being sold to Fareham Council, for £97,000, in 1962. The main school house was demolished in 1967. The site and the surviving buildings are now a community centre. There is a memorial to the family in the 12th-century Rowner Parish Church of St Mary the Virgin, PO13 9SU.

Notable alumni

A to D

 Harry Barron  CVO, army officer, Governor of Tasmania and Governor of Western Australia
Bryan Bertram Bellew MC, Irish peer
 Lord Charles Beresford Baron Beresford GCB GCVO, Commander-in-Chief, Mediterranean Fleet and Member of Parliament for Marylebone, Woolwich and Portsmouth
Dallas G. M. Bernard, baronet
Vivian Henry Gerald Bernard CB, admiral who took part in the Battle of Jutland
 Richard Bevan, Royal Navy officer
 Andrew Bickford CMG, Commander-in-Chief, Pacific Station
* Henry Blagrove, naval officer, killed in the destruction of HMS Royal Oak during the Second World War
* Richard Boyle, 6th Earl of Shannon, peer and politician in the Legislative Assembly of the Northwest Territories
* Harold Briggs, Member of Parliament for Manchester Blackley
* Paul Bush KCB CVO, Commander-in-Chief, Cape of Good Hope Station
* Houston Stewart Chamberlain, political philosopher, racialist, expert on Wagner and inspirer for National Socialist ideology
* Neville Francis Fitzgerald Chamberlain KCB KCVO KPM, army officer, Inspector General of the Royal Irish Constabulary and inventor of snooker
 Archibald Cochrane CMG, (1874-1952), Rear-Admiral
 Reginald B. B. Colmore OBE, Director of Airship Development, circa 1924
* Stanley Colville GCB GCMG GCVO, Commander-in-Chief, Portsmouth
Sir C. Preston Colvin, administrator of colonial railways in Burma and India
* Ragnar Colvin KBE CB, Commander-in-Chief of the Royal Australian Navy
* John Gregory Crace KBE CB, naval officer
 Andrew Cunningham, 1st Viscount Cunningham of Hyndhope KT GCB OM DSO, Commander-in-Chief, Mediterranean Fleet, First Sea Lord, Lord High Commissioner to the General Assembly of the Church of Scotland and Lord High Steward
 John H. D. Cunningham GCB MVO, Commander-in-Chief, Levant, Commander-in-Chief, Mediterranean Fleet and First Sea Lord
* Peter Danckwerts GC MBE FRS, George Cross winner and Shell Professor of Chemical Engineering
* Hubert Edward Dannreuther DSO, naval officer
 Gerald Charles Dickens KCVO CB CMG, naval officer
* Angus Falconer Douglas-Hamilton VC, army officer and posthumous winner of the Victoria Cross

E to K

Sydney Marow Eardley-Wilmot, rear-admiral and writer who was knighted in 1908; son of Sir John Eardley-Wilmot, 2nd Baronet
 Bolton Eyres-Monsell, 1st Viscount Monsell PC GBE, naval officer, Member of Parliament for Evesham, Chief Whip and First Lord of the Admiralty
* George Eyston  , British racing driver and land speed record holder
* Tony Fasson GC, naval officer and George Cross winner
 Eric Fellowes, 3rd Baron Ailwyn, naval officer and peer
* Humphrey Osbaldston Brooke Firman VC, naval officer and Victoria Cross winner
 Douglas Fisher KCB KBE, Admiral and Fourth Sea Lord
* Maurice Swynfen Fitzmaurice KCVO CB CMG, Director of Naval Intelligence, Commander-in-Chief, Africa Station and musician
* Launcelot Fleming KCVO DD, naval chaplain, Bishop of Portsmouth, Bishop of Norwich and Dean of Windsor

* Richard Foster KCB CMG DSO, son of headmaster Montagu Henry Foster, Adjutant-General Royal Marines and later colonel of the East Surrey Regiment

 Wilfred French KCB CMG, naval officer
* Cyril Fuller KCB CMG DSO, Commander-in-Chief, North America and West Indies Station, Second Sea Lord and Chief of Naval Personnel
Herbert Arthur Stevenson Fyler KCB DSO, admiral
* John Gaimes DSO, submarine commander, died in HMS K5
* Bryan Godfrey-Faussett GCVO CMG, naval officer and courtier
* Somerset Gough-Calthorpe GCB GCMG CVO, Commander-in-Chief, Mediterranean Fleet and Commander-in-Chief, Portsmouth
Heathcoat Salusbury Grant  CB, admiral
* William Lowther Grant KCB, Commander-in-Chief, China Station and Commander-in-Chief, North America and West Indies Station
* Anthony Griffin GCB, Controller of the Navy
* George Grogan VC CB CMG DSO, army officer and Victoria Cross winner
* Vernon Haggard KCB CMG, Commander-in-Chief, North America and West Indies Station
* Guy Hallifax CMG, naval officer and founder of the Seaward Defence Force, South Africa
 Lionel Halsey GCMG GCVO KCIE CB, naval officer and courtier
 Henry Harwood KCB OBE, commander at the Battle of the River Plate, Commander-in-Chief, Mediterranean Fleet and Commander-in-Chief, Levant
* Lanoe George Hawker VC DSO, airman and Victoria Cross winner
Godfrey Herbert, DSO, a naval officer and submariner who was involved with the ill-fated K-boats and accused of war crimes as a result of the Baralong Incidents
 Frank Hopkins KCB DSO DSC, Commander-in-Chief, Portsmouth
 Henry Horan CB DSC, Commander-in-Chief, New Zealand Division
* Philip Hunloke GCVO, Olympic sailor and courtier
* Patrick Huskinson  , President of the Air Armaments Board and designer of Blockbuster bombs
* Edward Fitzmaurice Inglefield KBE, naval officer and Secretary to Lloyd's of London
Henry Bradwardine Jackson GCB, KCVO, FRS, Admiral of the Fleet and First Sea Lord during much of the First World War
William George Elmhirst Ruck Keene MVO, admiral and commander of Britannia Royal Naval College
* Mark Kerr CB CVO, Commander in Chief of the Royal Hellenic Navy, founder of the Royal Air Force and Deputy Chief of the Air Staff
* Herbert King-Hall KCB CVO DSO, Commander-in-Chief, Cape of Good Hope Station

L to R

* Edward Vere Levinge KCSI CIE, Lieutenant-Governor of Bihar and Orissa
 Arthur Longmore GCB DSO, Inspector General of the RAF and seaplane pioneer
Hubert Lynes CB, CMG, Rear Admiral and a noted ornithologist who was a Fellow of several learned societies
 Anthony Cecil Capel Miers VC KBE CB DSO, submariner and Victoria Cross winner
 Alexander Mountbatten, 1st Marquess of Carisbrooke GCB GCVO, Prince of Battenberg and grandson of Queen Victoria
Henry Gerard Laurence Oliphant DSO, naval commander in the Battle of Dover Strait (1916)
 William Nicholson KCB, Third Sea Lord and Controller of the Navy
* William Hacket Pain KBE CB, army officer, Commissioner of the Royal Irish Constabulary and Member of Parliament for South Londonderry
* William Christopher Pakenham KCB  KCVO, Commander-in-Chief, North America and West Indies Station and Bath King of Arms
* George Patey  KCVO, Commander-in-Chief, North America and West Indies Station
* Lawrence Pattinson KBE CB DSO  , AOC Flying Training Command
 Frederick Peake CMG CBE, army officer known as Peake Pasha
 Arthur Peters KCB DSC, naval officer
 Tom Phillips GBE KCB DSO, Commander-in-Chief, China Station, commander of Force Z, killed on HMS Prince of Wales
* Robert Prendergast KCB, naval officer
Lionel Preston KCB, Admiral and Fourth Sea Lord
 Thomas Prickett KCB DSO DSC AOC Transport Command and Air Member for Supply and Organisation
* Robert Poore CIE DSO, cricketer for South Africa and army officer
* Henry Rawlings GBE KCB, Commander-in-Chief, West Africa, Commander-in-Chief, Mediterranean Fleet and commander of Task Force 57
* Felix Ready GBE KCB CSI CMG DSO, Quartermaster-General to the Forces
 David Renton, Baron Renton PC KBE QC TD DL, Member of Parliament for Huntingdonshire, Minister of State at the Home Office and Deputy Speaker in the House of Lords
* John Phillips Rhodes DSO, baronet and Member of Parliament for Stalybridge and Hyde
 Frank Rose KCB DSO, Commander-in-Chief, East Indies Station
 Charles Ross CB DSO army officer
* Guy Royle KCB CMG, naval officer, secretary to the Lord Great Chamberlain and Yeoman Usher of the Black Rod
William Ruck-Keene, admiral

S to Z

 Robert Falcon Scott CVO, naval officer and Antarctic explorer
* Hugh Sinclair KCB, known as Quex, Director of British Naval Intelligence, head of SIS and GCHQ
* Geoffrey Spicer-Simson DSO, naval officer
Aubrey St Clair-Ford DSO and bar, baronet
 John Miles Steel GCB KBE CMG, AOC RAF Bomber Command and AOC RAF Home Command
* Edward Neville Syfret GCB KBE, Commander-in-Chief, Home Fleet and commander of Force H
 John Ellis Talbot, British Conservative politician, Member of Parliament for Brierley Hill
 Ernest Augustus Taylor CMG CVO, naval officer and Member of Parliament for Paddington South
*Evelyn Thomson CB DSO, naval officer
 Ion Tower DSC, naval officer
 Beachcroft Towse VC KCVO CBE, soldier, Victoria Cross winner, courtier and campaigner for the blind
* Sir Humphrey de Trafford, 4th Baronet , army officer and race horse owner
* Rudolph de Trafford OBE, baronet, army officer and banker
* Charles Vaughan-Lee KBE CB, naval officer
* Arthur Waistell KCB, Commander-in-Chief, China Station, Commander-in-Chief, Portsmouth
Algernon Walker-Heneage-Vivian CB MVO, served in the defence at Ladysmith, became an admiral and, in 1926, High Sheriff of Glamorgan
* Humphrey T. Walwyn KCB KCSI KCMG CB DSO, naval officer and Governor of Newfoundland
 Andrew Gilbert Wauchope CB CMG, army officer and politician, killed at the Battle of Magersfontein
 John Baker White, spy, journalist and Member of Parliament for Canterbury
* Sir William Wiseman, 10th Baronet, intelligence agent and investment banker
* Edmund Walter Hanbury Wood, Member of Parliament for Stalybridge and Hyde
 Sandy Woodward GBE KCB, Commander-in-Chief, Home Fleet and Falklands Battle Group Commander
* Algernon Yelverton, 6th Viscount Avonmore, Irish nobleman

See also
 Burney's Academy
 Eastman’s Royal Naval Academy

References
Notes

Citations

Further reading

External links
 A view of the main school building, ca. 1965, (Hantsphere Collections)
 A view of a different elevation from the same time, (Hantsphere Collections)

Defunct schools in the Royal Borough of Windsor and Maidenhead
Boys' schools in Berkshire
Educational institutions established in 1841
Educational institutions disestablished in 1997
1841 establishments in England
Defunct schools in Hampshire
1997 disestablishments in England
 
Preparatory schools associated with the Royal Navy